Gunshot is 1996 Telugu-language mystery film directed by S. V. Krishna Reddy starring Ali, Prakash Raj and Keerthi Reddy. It was Keerthi Reddy's debut film. The film won two Nandi Awards. The film was not commercially successful.

Plot

Cast
Ali as Rambabu 
 Prakash Raj as Prakash
 Keerthi Reddy
 Babu Mohan 
 Tanikella Bharani
 Kota Srinivasa Rao
 Brahmanandam
 Madhurima Narla

Awards
Nandi Awards
 Best Villain - Prakash Raj
 Best Editor - K. Ram Gopal Reddy

Soundtrack

Reception 
A critic opined that "Director S.V.Krishna Reddy seems to be sailing successfully from phantasm via melodrama to buffoonery".

References

External links

1990s comedy thriller films
Indian comedy thriller films
Indian road movies
Films directed by S. V. Krishna Reddy
Films scored by S. V. Krishna Reddy
1990s Telugu-language films
1996 comedy films
1996 films